This is an alphabetical list of diplomatic training institutions.

 Academia Diplomática de Chile Andrés Bello, Santiago, Chile
 Academia Diplomática del Ecuador Galo Plaza Lasso, Quito, Ecuador
 Academia Diplomática de Nicaragua José de Marcoleta,  Managua Nicaragua
 Academia Diplomática del Peru Javier Pérez de Cuéllar, Lima, Perú
 Asia Pacific College of Diplomacy, The Australia National University, Canberra, Australia
 Ateneo de Manila University, Philippines
 Azerbaijan Diplomatic Academy, Baku, Azerbaijan
Bahrain's Diplomatic Institute, Manama, Bahrain 
Balsillie School of International Affairs, Canada
 Bandaranaike International Diplomatic Training Institute, Colombo, Sri Lanka 
 Bulgarian Diplomatic Institute, Sofia, Bulgaria
 Consular & Diplomatic Service University (CDSU)
 Centre for International Studies and Diplomacy, School of Oriental and African Studies, University of London, UK
 Centre for Politics and Diplomatic Studies, University of Leicester, UK
 College of Europe
 De La Salle - College of Saint Benilde 
 DiploFoundation, Malta
 Diplomatic Institute, Israel
 Diplomatic Academy, Australia 
 Diplomacy Academy, Turkey
 Diplomacy Training Program, University of New South Wales, Australia
Diplomatic Academy, Foreign and Commonwealth Office, United Kingdom
 Diplomatic Academy of the Ministry of Foreign Affairs of the Russian Federation
 Diplomatic Academy, Hellenic Ministry of Foreign Affairs, Athens
 Diplomatic Academy of Vienna
 Diplomatic Institute of Paris, Washington, DC 
 Edelstam Institute of Education for Human Rights and International Affairs
 Edmund A. Walsh School of Foreign Service, Georgetown University, Washington, DC
Elliott School of International Affairs, George Washington University, Washington, DC
 Emirates Diplomatic Academy, United Arab Emirates 
 Escuela Diplomática of Spain.
European Academy of Diplomacy, Poland
 Fletcher School of Law and Diplomacy, Tufts University, Medford, Massachusetts
 Foreign Service Academy, Bangladesh
 Foreign Service Academy, Pakistan
 Foreign Service Institute India
 Foreign Service Institute of the Philippines
 Foreign Service Institute, George P. Shultz National Foreign Affairs Training Center, Arlington, Virginia
 Foreign Service Training Institute, Sagamihara, Japan
 Geneva School of Diplomacy and International Relations
 Graduate Institute of International and Development Studies
 Helena Z Benitez School of International Relations and Diplomacy, Philippine Women’s University
 Institut diplomatique et consulaire, Ministry of Foreign Affairs of France
 Institute for European Business Administration, Belgium
 Institute of Diplomacy & Foreign Relations (IDFR), Kuala Lumpur, Malaysia
 Institute of Strategic Relationship Management, Den Haag, Netherlands
 Institute of Diplomatic Studies, Cairo, Egypt
 Instituto de Educación Superior en Formación Diplomática y Consular "Dr. Eduardo Latorre Rodríguez" -INESDYC- of Dominican Republic
 Instituto del Servicio Exterior de la Nacion – Diplomatic Academy of Argentina
 Instituto del Servicio Exterior "Manuel Maria de Peralta" – Diplomatic Academy of Costa Rica
 Instituto Matías Romero, Mexico City
 International School of Protocol & Diplomacy, Brussels, Belgium
 Istituto Diplomatico - Ministry of Foreign Affairs of Italy
 Josef Korbel School of International Studies, University of Denver, Denver, Colorado, USA
 Kofi Annan Peace Keeping Training Centre - Accra, Ghana
 Kuwait Diplomatic Institute (KDI)
 Lancaster University, Department of Politics, Philosophy and Religion
 Legon Centre for International Affairs and Diplomacy (LECIAD) University of Ghana, Legon
 London Academy of Diplomacy, validating partner Stirling University
 Lyceum of the Philippines University-Cavite, Department of Foreign Service, Governors Drive, Manggahan, General Trias, Cavite, Philippines
 Luiss University, Rome, Italy
 Maxwell School of Citizenship and Public Affairs
 Mediterranean Academy of Diplomatic Studies (MEDAC), Malta
 Moscow State Institute of International Relations
 Mozambique-Tanzania Centre For Foreign Relations Dar es Salaam
 National Korean Diplomatic Agency, Seoul, Korea
 Netherlands Institute of International Relations Clingendael
 Norman Paterson School of International Affairs, Carleton University, Ottawa, Canada
 Oxford University Diplomatic Studies Programme
 Paris School of International Affaires (PSIA), Institut d'études politiques de Paris (Sciences Po), France
 Patterson School of Diplomacy and International Commerce, University of Kentucky, Lexington, Kentucky
 Paul H. Nitze School of Advanced International Studies, Johns Hopkins University, Baltimore, Maryland
 Peruvian Diplomatic Academy, Lima, Peru
 Pontifical Ecclesiastical Academy, Rome
 Prince Saud Al Faisal Institute of Diplomatic Studies, Riyadh
 Protocolbureau, Den Haag, Netherlands
 Rio Branco Institute, the diplomatic academy of the Ministry of External Relations of Brazil
 Royal United Services Institute
 School of International and Public Affairs, Columbia University (SIPA), New York City, NY
 School of International Service, American University, Washington, DC
 The Diplomatic Academy of the Caribbean, Trinidad and Tobago
 USC School of International Relations, Los Angeles, California, U.S.A.
 United Nations International School
 United Nations International School of Hanoi
 United Nations Institute for Training and Research (UNITAR), Geneva, Switzerland, and New York, New York
 University of International Relations, Beijing, China
 University for Peace
 US Institute of Diplomacy and Human Rights, Washington, D.C., U.S.A.
School of Diplomacy and International Relations, Seton Hall University, South Orange, New Jersey
 Woodrow Wilson School of Public and International Affairs, Princeton University, New Jersey
 Zimbabwe Institute of Diplomacy, Julius Nyerere House, Belgravia, Harare

References

Diplomacy
Training
Institutions